Hypatima stenosa is a moth in the family Gelechiidae. It was described by Kyu-Tek Park and Margarita Gennadievna Ponomarenko in 1999. It is found in Thailand.

The length of the forewings is about 9 mm. The forewings are yellowish white, with irregularly scattered brown scales and a large, trapezoidal subbasal costal patch. The hindwings are grey.

Etymologly
The species name refers to the narrow forewing and is derived from Greek  (meaning narrow).

References

Hypatima
Moths described in 1999